TVB Pearl is a terrestrial television channel in Hong Kong owned by Television Broadcasts Limited. Established on 19 November 1967, it shares headquarters with TVB's other properties at TVB City at 77 Chun Choi Street in Tseung Kwan O Industrial Estate in Tseung Kwan O, in the Sai Kung District.

This channel mainly broadcasts in English (while all of its sister channels mainly broadcast in Cantonese), although programmes in other languages (including Mandarin, Japanese and Korean) are aired in non-peak hours and Traditional Chinese subtitles are available on some programmes. Since 1991, the channel has used NICAM digital audio (and later, multiple audio tracks via digital terrestrial television) to transmit audio tracks in English and Cantonese when available. The channel began broadcasting in high definition on 28 October 2012.

The schedule of this channel relies heavily on imported programmes, including foreign drama series and movies. Original English-language news and current affairs programmes (such as News at 7:30) and original lifestyle programme Dolce Vita are also available on the channel.

Programmes

News and public affairs
This channel airs current affairs programmes, including Pearl Magazine (to replace both The Pearl Report and Money Magazine in 2018), Money Matters and Straight Talk.

According to the broadcast regulations in Hong Kong, broadcasting 2.5 hours of RTHK programmes on commercial English-language channels every week was required. Before 2017, such requirement was fulfilled by broadcasting The Pulse (news programme) and The Works (art-related programme). These two programmes were no longer aired on this channel after 2017.

Studio 930 
At 9:30 PM every night, a Hollywood film is broadcast on TVB Pearl with a Hong Kong English Dub or with British English Subtitles before News Roundup news programmes.

Transmitters 
TVB Pearl is broadcast through UHF from its six main transmission stations at Temple Hill, Golden Hill, Castle Peak, Kowloon Peak, Tai Mo Shan, and Lamma Island, and two repeaters at Tsuen Wan and Tsing Yi. The Tsuen Wan repeater started service on 22 August 2003, and the Tsing Yi repeater started on 18 September 2003. The repeaters were built to enhance reception of TVB Pearl.

TVB Pearl is carried in mainland China by Southern Television in Guangdong and in Guangzhou by Guangzhou Television. Due to censorship policies, some programmes carried by the channel have been censored and substituted with different programmes.

TVB Pearl's analogue transmission ceased on 30 November 2020.

Awards
TVB Pearl has received a number of awards throughout its long history of programme production. For example, The Pearl Report: Outsider won a merit at the Hong Kong Human Rights Press Awards 2002. Also, 2008 Olympic Image was awarded the Bronze Medal (Station and Image Production) in the New York Festivals.

See also
ViuTVsix, an English-language channel in Hong Kong since March 2017
 Hong Kong International Business Channel, Channel 76, an English-language channel in Hong Kong since March 2018

References

External links
 

English-language television stations
Television channels and stations established in 1967
Television stations in Hong Kong
Pearl